Blaenrhondda railway station served the village of Blaenrhondda, in the historical county of Glamorganshire, Wales, from 1890 to 1968 on the Rhondda and Swansea Bay Railway.

History 
The station was opened on 2 July 1890 on the Rhondda and Swansea Bay Railway. It was known as Blean-Rhondda in the Great Western Railway timetable until 1936. It was downgraded to a request stop in 1965 and closed on 26 February 1968 due to the tunnel being unsafe.

References

External links 

Disused railway stations in Rhondda Cynon Taf
Railway stations in Great Britain opened in 1890
Railway stations in Great Britain closed in 1968
Beeching closures in Wales
1890 establishments in Wales
1968 disestablishments in Wales